Kanal D, also known as Channel D, is a nationwide television channel in Turkey and part of Demirören Group. It was founded by Ayhan Şahenk and Aydın Doğan in 1993.

The network also runs an international channel, Euro D since 1996, which is available online, and had the first high definition channel in Turkey, Kanal D HD.

The text 'KANAL D' is not displayed in its Turkish broadcast. Only the blue earth section of the logo is displayed throughout commercial sections. Kanal D is broadcast via satellite to 27 countries.

Kanal D Romania
On 18 February 2007, Kanal D launched a television channel in Romania under the same name.

Notes

References

External links
 Kanal D Turkey 
 Kanal D at LyngSat Address

Television stations in Turkey
Turkish-language television stations
Television channels and stations established in 1993
Doğan Media Group
Mass media in Istanbul